In baseball, the dead-ball era was the period from around 1900 to the emergence of Babe Ruth as a power hitter in 1919, when he hit a then–major league record 29 home runs; only three players since 1890 had even hit 20. This era was characterized by low-scoring games and a lack of home runs; league batting averages dropped as low as .239 in 1908, producing the lowest league run average in history, with teams averaging only 3.4 runs per game. Teams played in spacious ballparks that limited hitting for power; as a further hindrance to scoring, the ball used then, compared to modern baseballs, was "dead" both by design and from overuse. In addition, ball scuffing and adulteration by pitchers, notably the spitball, was not against the rules during this period.

Baseball during the dead-ball era 

During the dead-ball era, baseball was much more of a strategy-driven game, using a style of play now known as small ball or inside baseball. It relied much more on plays such as stolen bases and hit-and-run than on home runs. These strategies emphasized speed, perhaps by necessity.

Low-power hits like the Baltimore Chop, developed in the 1890s by the Baltimore Orioles, were used to get on base. Once on base, a runner would often steal or be bunted over to second base, then move to third base or score on a hit-and-run play. In no other era have teams stolen as many bases as in the dead-ball era.

Meanwhile, there were 20 instances where the league leader in triples had 20 or more.

Owen "Chief" Wilson set a record of 36 triples in 1912, a record that is likely one of baseball's unbreakable records, as is that of the 309 career triples of Sam Crawford set during this time.

Despite their speed, teams struggled to score during the dead-ball era. The lack of power in the game also meant lower slugging percentages and on-base percentages, as pitchers could challenge hitters more without the threat of the home run. In the latter year, the Chicago White Sox hit three home runs for the entire season, yet they finished 88–64, just a couple of games from winning the pennant.

Some players and fans complained about the low-scoring games, and league officials sought to remedy the situation. In , Ben Shibe invented the cork-centered ball, which the Reach Company—official ball supplier to the American League—began marketing. Spalding, Reach's parent company which separately supplied the National League, followed with its own cork-center ball.

The change in the ball dramatically affected play in both leagues. In , the American League batting average ; in 1911, it rose . The  season happened to be the best of Ty Cobb's career; he  with 248 hits. Joe Jackson  in 1911, and the next year Cobb .

In , however, minor league pitcher Russ Ford noticed that a ball scuffed against a concrete wall quickly dived as it reached the batter. This so-called emery ball, together with the spitball, gave pitchers greatly increased control of the batter, especially since a single ball—rarely replaced during a game—would become increasingly scuffed as play progressed, as well as more difficult to see as it became dirtier. By  run scoring was essentially back to the pre-1911 years and remained so until 1919.

In this era, Frank Baker earned the nickname "Home Run" Baker merely for hitting two home runs in the 1911 World Series; although he led the American League in home runs four times (1911–1914), his highest home run season was 1913, when he hit 12, and he finished with 96 home runs for his career. However, Cravath played in the Baker Bowl, a notoriously hitter-friendly park with only a short  distance from the plate to the right-field wall.

Contributing factors 
The following factors contributed to the dramatic decline in runs scored during the dead-ball era:

Foul strike rule 
The foul strike rule was a major rule change that, in just a few years, sent baseball from a high-scoring game to a game where scoring any runs was a struggle. Under the foul strike rule, a batter who fouls off is charged with a strike unless he already has two strikes against him. The National League adopted the foul strike rule in 1901, and the American League followed suit in 1903. Prior to this rule, foul balls did not count as strikes. Thus, a batter could foul off a countless number of pitches with no strikes counted against him—except for bunt attempts, which gave batters an enormous advantage until the foul strike rule was put in place.

Ball construction and use 
Before 1921, it was common for a baseball to be in play for over 100 pitches. Players used the same ball until it started to unravel. Early baseball leagues were very cost-conscious, so fans had to throw back balls that had been hit into the stands, as is still the case in other sports leagues such as the National Basketball Association and the National Football League. The longer the ball was in play, the softer it became—and hitting a heavily used, softer ball for distance is much more difficult than hitting a new, harder one. The ball was also softer to begin with, making home runs less likely.

Spitball 
The ball was also hard to hit because pitchers could manipulate it before a pitch. For example, the spitball pitch was permitted in baseball until 1921. Pitchers often marked the ball, scuffed it, spat on it—anything they could to influence the ball's motion. This made the ball "dance" and curve much more than it does now, making it more difficult to hit. Tobacco juice was often added to the ball as well, which discolored it. This made the ball difficult to see, especially since baseball parks did not have lights until the late 1930s. This made both hitting and fielding more difficult.

Ballpark size 
The dimensions of Braves Field prompted Ty Cobb to say that no one would ever hit the ball out of it.

End of the era 
The dead-ball era ended suddenly. By 1921, offenses were scoring 40% more runs and hitting four times as many home runs as they had in 1918. Baseball historians debate the abruptness of this change, with no consensus on its cause. Six popular theories have been advanced:

 Changes in the ball: This theory claims that owners replaced the ball with a newer, livelier ball (sometimes referred to as the "jackrabbit" ball), presumably with the intention of boosting offense and, by extension, ticket sales. The theory has been rebutted by Major League Baseball. The yarn used to wrap the core of the ball was changed prior to the 1920 season, although testing by the United States Bureau of Standards found no difference in the physical properties of the two different types of balls. The so-called "livelier" ball was actually introduced in 1911, when the league began using a cork-centered ball, as opposed to rubber, and that year the number of total home runs was 514, having been 361 the previous season. Frank Schulte became the first player of the 20th century to reach twenty home runs in a season.
 Outlawing certain pitches: Pitches now considered illegal, per MLB Rule 6.02(c), were outlawed. This included the shine ball, emery ball, and spitball (a very effective pitch throughout the dead-ball era). This theory states that without such effective pitches in the pitcher's arsenal, batters gained an advantage. When the spitball was outlawed in 1920, MLB recognized seventeen pitchers who had built their careers specializing in the spitball and permitted them to continue using it; the last pitcher allowed to do so, Burleigh Grimes, pitched until the end of 1934.
 More baseballs per game: The fatal beaning of Cleveland Indians shortstop Ray Chapman in August 1920 led to a rule that the baseball must be replaced every time that it got dirty. With a clean ball in play at all times, players no longer had to contend with a ball that "traveled through the air erratically, tended to soften in the later innings, and as it came over the plate, was very hard to see."
 Stat keeping and rule changes: In 1920, the major leagues adopted writer Fred Lieb's proposal that a game-winning home run with men on base count as a home run, even if its run is not needed to win the game. Owners tried unsuccessfully to eliminate the intentional walk. They succeeded only in changing the rules to require that the catcher be within the catcher's box when the pitcher throws‚ and that everything that happened in a protested game was added to the game record. (From 1910 to 1919‚ records in protested games were excluded.)
 Babe Ruth: One theory is that the prolific success of Babe Ruth at hitting home runs led players around the league to forsake their old methods of hitting (described above) and adopt a "free-swinging" style designed to hit the ball hard and with an uppercut stroke, with the intention of hitting more home runs. Critics of this theory claim that it does not account for the improvement in batting averages from 1918 to 1921, over which time the league average improved  .
 Ballpark dimensions: This theory contends that offensive success came from changes in the dimensions of the ballparks. Accurate estimates of ballpark sizes of the era can be difficult to find, however, so there is disagreement over whether the dimensions changed at all, let alone whether the change led to improved offense. A 1920 season rule change stated that balls hit over the fence in fair territory but landing foul were fair, and hence home runs rather than foul balls.

See also 

 Live-ball era
 Inside baseball
 The Glory of Their Times

Explanatory notes

References

Baseball genres
History of Major League Baseball